Clan MacLeod of Raasay, commonly known as Clan MacLeod of Raasay, is a Highland Scottish clan, which at its height held extensive lands on the Isle of Raasay and west coast of Scotland. From the 14th century up until the beginning of the 17th century there were two branches of Macleods: the MacLeods of Dunvegan and Harris (Clan MacLeod); and the Macleods of Lewis. In Gaelic the Macleods of Lewis were known as Sìol Thorcaill ("Seed of Torquil"), and the MacLeods of Dunvegan and Harris were known as Sìol Thormoid ("Seed of Tormod").

The traditional progenitor of the MacLeods was Leod, whom tradition made a son of Olaf the Black, King of Mann and the Isles. Tradition gave Leod two sons, Tormod - progenitor of the Macleods of Harris and Dunvegan (Sìol Thormoid); and Torquil - progenitor of the Macleods of Lewis (Sìol Thorcaill). In the 16th and early 17th centuries the chiefly line of the Clan Macleod of The Lewes was nearly extinguished by the bloodthirsty and power-hungry chief "Old Rory" his various offspring. This feuding directly led to the fall of the clan, and loss of its lands to the Clan Mackenzie. One line of the 16th century chiefly family, the Macleods of Raasay, survived and prospered on their lands for centuries thereafter. The current Chief the Macleods of Raasay is Roderick John Macleod, the 18th Chief who resides in Tasmania. He is the fifth Chief to have lived in Tasmania.

Today the Clan MacLeod of Raasay, The Lewes and Clan Macleod are represented by "Associated Clan MacLeod Societies", and the chiefs of the three clans. The association is made up of ten national societies across the world including: Australia, Canada, England, France, Germany, New Zealand, Scotland, South Africa, United States of America, and Switzerland.

Traditional Origins

Olaf the Black 
Today the official clan tradition is that the Macleods descend from Leod, born around 1200. Traditionally, from Leod's son Tormod the Macleods of Harris and Dunvegan claim descent, and through Leod's other son Torquil Macleods of Lewis claim descent. The earliest evidence of this traditional descent from Olaf the Black may only date as far back as the 17th century, from the era of Iain Mor MacLeod (chief of Clan Macleod 1626–1649) who was styled "John McOlaus of Dunvegane" in a document dated 1630. Also, his son Iain Breac (chief of Clan Macleod 1664–1693) is thought to have been the first Macleod to incorporate the coat of arms of the Kings of Mann into his own coat of arms, because the "Macleods imagined themselves descended from King Olaf of Man".

Macleods of Lewis 
The earliest reference to the Macleods of Lewis is found in a royal charter granted in the reign of David II King of Scots (reigned 1329–1371), when Torcall Macleod was granted the four penny land of Assynt, possibly in c.1343. In this charter Torcall had no designation, showing that he held no property until then. By 1344 the Macleods of Lewis held the Isle of Lewis as vassals of the Macdonalds of Islay. In time the Macleods of Lewis grew in power, with lands stretching from the islands of Lewis, Raasay, the district of Waternish on Skye, and on the mainland Assynt, Coigach and Gairloch.

Fall of the clan and loss of Lewis

The fall of the clan and loss of the Isle of Lewis, began with Ruairi and his marriage to a daughter of John Mackenzie of Kintail. This marriage had produced a son named Torquil Connanach. Ruairi later disowned Torquil Connanach on account of the alleged adultery between his wife and the Morrison brieve of Lewis. In about 1566 Torquil Connanach took up arms, supported by the Mackenzies and kept his supposed father Ruairi as prisoner within the castle of Stornoway. Ruairi took for his third wife a daughter of Hector Og Maclean of Duart, and had by her two sons, Torquil Dubh and Tormod. Ruairi then made Torquil Dubh his heir, and again Torquil Connanach took up arms supported by the Mackenzies. Ruairi was again captured, and many of his men were killed. Upon Torquil Connanach's victory all charters and title deeds of Lewis were handed over to the Mackenzies. Ruairi was held captive in the castle of Stornoway, commanded by Torquil Connanach's son John, though was freed when Ruairi Og attacked the castle and killed John. Upon his release Ruairi ruled Lewis in peace for the rest of his life (1596).

Upon the death of Ruairi Macleod of The Lewes, the chieftainship of the clan passed to Torquil Dubh. In 1596 Torquil Dubh, with a force of seven or eight hundred men, devastated Torquil Connanach's lands of Coigach and the Mackenzie lands of Loch Broom. In consequence, Torquil Dubh was summoned to appear before the Privy Council and was declared a rebel when he failed to appear. Torquil Dubh was finally betrayed by the Brieve of Lewis, chief of the Morrisons of Ness. Once captured, the brieve sent Torquil Dubh to Coigach where he and his companions were beheaded by Torquil Connanach, on the orders of Kenneth Mackenzie of Kintail in July 1597. Following this, Lewis was commanded by Torquil Dubh's three young sons and his illegitimate brother Niall. The Macleods of Lewis were also aided by the Macleods of Harris and the Macleans.

Because the Mackenzies now had the title deeds of Lewis, the island was forfeited by the Act of Estates in 1597, which gave the Scottish Government an excuse to attempt the colonisation the island. After the conquest of Lewis by the Mackenzies, Niall Macleod (brother of Torquil Dubh, his nephews and about thirty others took refuge on Bearasay in the mouth of Loch Roag on the west coast of Lewis. For almost three years the small group of Macleods held out against the Mackenzies before being driven off. With the end of the line of the Macleods of Lewis, the title Lord Macleod was the second title of the Mackenzie, Earls of Cromartie. Also the chiefship of the Macleods of Lewis has passed to the Macleods of Rassay, who hold it to this day.

History

16th Century 
The Macleods of Raasay are descended from Malcolm Macleod IX of Lewis who, about 1510, gave his second son, known as Calum Garbh (Malcolm the Stout), of his patrimony the islands of Raasay and Rona as well as the districts of Coigeach and Gairloch on the western mainland of Ross.  The first Macleod of Raasay (Mac Gillechaluim) was Malcolm Garbh Macleod ( – 1560). In 1532 we find Farquhar, Bishop of the Isles, had occasion to call to account MacNeil of Barra and "Mac Gillechalum callit of Raasay".  In 1549 Dean Monro stated that "Raasay belonged to Mac Gillechalum by the sword and the Bishop of the Isles by heritage".  Malcolm was married and had at least two sons, Alexander, and John. John was known as Iain na Tuaighe (John of the Axe), who carried off Janet, wife of his uncle Roderick Macleod X of Lewis and afterwards married her.  By Janet Mackenzie, John had several sons and a daughter.  The sons died in the massacre in the island of Isay. Malcolm's son, Malcolm Og effectively became Laird of Raasay during the lifetime of his father when he received a Royal Charter, dated 20 July 1596, investing him with his father's lands. The description of Malcolm Og's death, like that of his brother John, survives in various manuscripts.  On 11 August 1611 a ship cast anchor in Clachan Bay, Raasay. On board were Murdoch MacKenzie, son of John Roy MacKenzie IV of Gairloch, and several of his followers. In the ensuing fight all the Macleods, including Malcolm Og, on board the ship was slain, including Malcolm Og.  Several Mackenzies were also killed in the fight.

17th Century 
John Garbh, VII Chief ( – 1671, who was served heir to his father on 22 September 1648, was distinguished among all his contemporaries for his size and strength.  He met his death by drowning in the Minch when returning from Lewis at Easter 1671. John Garbh was probably the last chief to live in Brochel Castle.  The dating of Brochel has generally been regarded as 15th Century work, based on its ground plan and features of the stonework.  Clearly it had a strategic position being on the main sea route from Kyle of Lochalsh to Lewis and looking out over to Applecross in Ross on the mainland.  It would have been highly desirable to control the waters of the Inner Sound in those empire-building days.

18th Century 
1745 – 1746 Jacobite uprising

Malcolm, X Chief ( – 1761) was a Jacobite, who, accompanied by his second son, Dr Murdoch Macleod of Eyre, and his cousin Captain Malcolm Macleod of Brae, joined Prince Charles Edward Stuart with 100 men. The Chief had wisely taken the precaution to convey his estate to his eldest son John, so that whatever might be the outcome of the Jacobite Rising the Raasay estate would remain secure in the hands of a member of the family.  After the battle of Culloden, Raasay managed to return to his estate, with some of his men.

In retribution for Macleod of Raasay taking part at Culloden for the Jacobite cause, Government troops landed in Raasay, destroyed Raasay House and set fire to every house on the island.  All cattle, horses and sheep were rounded up and appropriated, even the boats were confiscated. It is amazing to discover how well the island recovered from this orgy of destruction.

After the Battle of Culloden, Prince Charles Edward Stuart spent several weeks in the Highlands and Islands of Scotland avoiding capture with Government troops in pursuit.  There was a price of 30,000 pounds on his head. Prince Charles hid for two days on Raasay but thinking the island too narrow and confined for the purpose of concealment, he departed on 2 July 1746.

Boswell and Johnsons Tour of the Hebrides 
In Boswell's The Journal of a Tour to the Hebrides in 1773, we read that Raasay House was rebuilt "by this Raasay", John XI of Raasay. "His father was out in 1745 but had previously conveyed the estate to him so there was no forfeiture: but as the Prince was known to have had an asylum in Raasay, those employed under the Government burnt every house upon the island".  Boswell continues, "It is really a place where one may live in plenty and even in luxury.  This island has abundance of black cattle, sheep and goats; a good many horses, which are used for ploughing, carrying out dung, etc."

Dr Johnson in his work A Journey to the Western Isles, said, "This is truly patriarchal life.  This is what we came to find".  The lexicographer found life in Raasay most agreeable.  "Such a seat of hospitality amids the winds and waters fills the mind with a delightful contrariety of images with the rough ocean and howling storm without; within is plenty and elegance, beauty and gaiety, the song and the dance.  In Raasay, if I could have found an Ulyssess, IU had fancied Phocaia".

19th Century 
James, 12th Chief, (1761 – 1823) further improved the Raasay Estate and added to Raasay House.  He was Lieutenant Colonel of the 1st Isle of Skye Regiment. In 1805 he married Flora Ann, daughter of Lieutenant Colonel Maclean of Muck, with issue of four surviving sons and one daughter; John, Loudoun, James, Francis, and Hannah.

James died in 1823, and was succeeded by his eldest son, John, who became 13th Chief of Raasay.

John was an officer in the 78th Highlanders, married Mary, only daughter of Sir Donald Macleod of Varkasaig, a distinguished officer in the Indian Army.

Their only child, Mary Julia Hastings born 1836, died in 1839 and is buried in the small chapel behind Raasay House, where her memorial tablet can still be seen.

A change in farming practices combined with the disastrous summers of 1839 and 1840 and the failure of cropping efforts led to poverty and distress. The family moved further into debt by further additions to Raasay House. Tenant crofters couldn't pay rents, over-population put demands on all resources, and as with many other Landlords and Highland Clan Chiefs, found themselves in financial difficulties. It was during this period that the region was affected with the Highland Clearances resulting in the mass depopulation of the Highlands of Scotland.

The Estate was sold to George Rainy Esquire in around 1843.

The Australian Chapter 
James Macleod, with his wife Mary was the first of the four MacLeod brothers to migrate to South Australia on 12 October 1838. Before leaving Scotland, James and the family bought land through The South Australian Company which was formed in London in 1835 and made a significant contribution to the foundation and settlement of South Australia. James' brother Loudoun, who arrived in South Australia in 1840, took up land under occupation licence, country known as the Tatiara, the beginning of settlement by white people of the region. Here, Loudoun founded the station known as Nalang, a lease of 126 square miles which was granted to Loudon Macleod on 26 February 1846.

Flora Ann Macleod and her son Francis and daughter Hannah arrived in Adelaide aboard the James Turcan on 26 November 1841. Mother and daughter took up residence at the Tavistock buildings in Adelaide. After continued poor health and bankruptcy, James died on 12 November 1844, and was buried at Rona, Maclaren Vale which was land still owned by Loudoun. He was only 31 years of age. Flora died at Adelaide on 11 June 1846 and was buried at West Terrace Cemetery.  Flora expressed it as her dying wish that the remains of her son, James, should be exhumed from the site at Rona, and interred with her in the cemetery.

This was done but not without extraordinary happenings. William Wallis, a young man of 22, when bringing James's remains to Adelaide in a cart, was killed when the horses bolted down the hills to the bridge at the Onkaparinga River, overturning the cart and crushing him.  There was some damage to the coffin, but the undertaker later denied the charge that was in circulation at the time that the remains had been scattered about the road. The accident happened at Willunga Hill on the old road at the back of the church. Eventually James' remains were placed in the vault beside his mother's at West Terrace Cemetery in Adelaide.

Hannah married Sir John Campbell of Ardnamurchan and Airds.

John Macleod, 13th Chief of Raasay, arrived in South Australia in 1846 and assisted Loudoun and Francis in running the Nalang property. John died at Nalang on 6 June 1860, headstone is near the Nalang homestead which has the following inscription: Erected in memory of John MacLeod, Esq., of Raasay, Chief of the Clan Torquile, who died June 6, 1860, aged 53.

Francis married Alice Jamesana Fenton on 1 December 1858 at St. David's Cathedral, Hobart.  She was the youngest daughter of Captain Michael Fenton of Fenton Forest, Glenora, Tasmania. Frank had the Nalang homestead built in 1857. Given the resemblance between this house and her home in Fenton Forest, Tasmania, Alice may have had some input into its design. The Surveyor General of South Australia, Mr George Woodroofe Goyder- he of "Goyder's Line" fame, surveyed the area in the 1860s. It is suggested that Mr Goyder reported to Parliament the quality of the Tatiara region, because in 1865 the South Australian Legislative Council decided on a policy of 'Distrainment' of the pastoral leases.

One of the first areas to be 'distrained ' was the Tatiara and Nalang was the first property on their list, significantly increasing the property's valuation, with a tenfold increase in rent. Unless they bought their house and improvements from the government, at the government's new valuation and paid the increased lease, the Macleod family was to be evicted.

Alice died in January 1867 at the age of 31 and was buried in the front paddock alongside her brother-in-law, Chief John in an unmarked grave. 1867 and 1868 were years of severe drought. Loudon Macleod died, 11 May 1868 and is buried at West Terrace Cemetery with his mother Flora, and brother James.

The lease on Nalang was reassigned to Francis. On the transfer of the lease the government increased the rent from 320 pounds to nearly 2000 pounds per year, a fortune in those days, which Frank was unable to pay.  Within twelve months Frank Macleod was bankrupt. Dispossessed, he was evicted from Nalang by the sheriff. He took the children to Tasmania where they were brought up by Alice's family.

Francis Macleod died in Melbourne in 1874.

The Tasmanian Chapter 
Francis and Alice's three surviving children; Loudoun Hector who succeeded his first cousin James Gawler as XV of Raasay, Michael Fenton married Florence, daughter of George Eadie, and Florence Hastings who married J.J. Moore of San Francisco. Loudoun Hector Macleod, XV of Raasay, was a Hobart accountant, a prominent footballer and cricketer, an alderman for the city of Hobart 1908 – 1919, and Mayor in 1916. He married Frances Laura Bright, daughter of Dr. Richard Bright of Hobart. They had three children, Torquil, Loudoun and Laura.

Torquil Bright Macleod, elder son of Loudoun Hector, succeeded his father as 16th Chief in 1935.  He was educated at Hutchins School, Hobart, and at Hawkesbury College, New South Wales. He served in 1914 as a Squadron Leader in the 3rd Light Horse Regiment, campaigning in Gallipoli and Palestine, and being promoted to the rank of captain.  In the 1939-45 war, he was Lieutenant Colonel, commanding the 22nd Light Horse and Motor Regiment.  He married Helen Christie, fourth daughter of G.C. Nicholas of Millbrook, Ouse, Tasmania and had two sons, Torquil Roderick and Henric Nicholas and two daughters, Katharine Christie, and Fiona.  He was a grazier and pastoralist at Richmond Park, Richmond from 1920 until his death in 1968.  A Justice of the Peace, he was also Warden of the Municipality of Richmond from 1948 to 1958. He was President of the Royal Agricultural Society of Tasmania from 1949 until 1952, and Churchwarden at St. Luke's Parish Church, Richmond for more than 40 years.

Torquil Roderick, succeeded his father in 1968 as 17th Chief of Raasay. He was born in 1919 and educated at the Hutchins and The Friends Schools in Hobart and Geelong Grammar School, Victoria, and Melbourne University.  He served in the 1939-45 War as a Company Commander in the 2nd/40th Battalion of the Australian Imperial Forces with Sparrow Force in the South West Pacific Islands and was taken prisoner of war in the disastrous opposed landing at Timor in 1942.  On 30 April 1947, he married Patricia Mary Lyttleton, only daughter of H.F. Turner and lived at Dysart House, Kempton, Tasmania.  Torquil Roderick was a Justice of the Peace, and Warden of the Municipality of Green Ponds.  President of the Royal Agricultural Society of Tasmania 1975 and 1976 and President of the Equestrian Federation of Australia since 1960. He obtained Matriculated Arms for both Macleod of Raasay (1981) and Macleod of Lewis (1988) and was officially recognised as "Torquil Roderick Macleod of The Lewes and Chief and Head of the Baronial House of Macleod of the Lewes" by Lord Lyon King of Arms. Prior to his death in 2001,in 1999, he resigned the Arms of Macleod of Raasay in favour of his son, Roderick John Macleod, as 18th Chief of the MacLeods of Raasay.

Roderick John, 18th and current Chief of Raasay, known as John, has a profound interest in Macleod activities, particularly those on the Isle of Raasay which he visits regularly and has developed a good relationship with the Islanders and interest in Island activities.
With this interest in Raasay matters, and more particularly Raasay House, John became Patron of the Raasay House Community Company, the organisation charged with the responsibility to manage the Community ownership of the House and oversee its restoration and future use. This restoration is now complete and stands proudly as it was but with modern internal fitments and facilities.

John was educated at The Friends School Hobart and completed a bachelor's in applied chemistry. On 12 August 1978, he married Elizabeth Grace, daughter of Kenneth Thorpe Downie of Nareen, Hamilton Tasmania. John continued his fathers and grandfathers interests in agricultural shows and was a director of both the Royal Agricultural Society of Tasmania and The Royal National Agricultural Pastoral Society, and president of the Brighton Show Society.  Additionally, John was a councillor for the Brighton Municipality and church warden for St Lukes Church, Pontville, Tasmania.

With a degree in industrial chemistry, John was employed at one of the world's largest zinc smelters in Hobart, but later followed his keen interest in agriculture to take a series of roles with a Tasmanian-based stock and station agent. More recently, John worked alongside Tasmanian industry and government to provide practical solutions to the states freight, logistics and infrastructure challenges and issues.

John has now retired allowing more time for Clan Macleod and family affairs, still travelling to the UK to visit family, and maintaining Clan interests. He has had the opportunity to attend and open Scottish Highland Games both locally and overseas. John and his wife Liz, have two children; Hannah who lives in Cambridge, England with her husband James Roberts and son Charlie and daughter Freya, and Alastair, Younger of Raasay, who with his wife Phoebe, and son Jack Roderick, live in Woodend, Victoria.

John is a member of the Standing Council of Scottish Chiefs.

Clan Profile

Origin of the Name 
The clan surnames MacLeod and McLeod (and other variants) are Anglicisations of the Gaelic patronymic name Mac Leòid meaning "son of Leòd". This Gaelic name (Leòd) is a form of the Old Norse personal name Ljótr which means "ugly".

Clan Chiefs

Castles 
Castles that have belonged to the Clan MacLeod of Raasay have included:

 Brochel Castle, a small and ruinous stronghold, seven miles of north of Clachan on Raasay, was held by the MacLeod of Raasay branch of the clan.
 Raasay House, built initially in the early 1700s as a small, laird's house by the Macleods of Raasay. However, the new house itself had to be reconstructed only a year or so later, when redcoats plundered the island for the Chiefs support for Bonnie Prince Charlie at Culloden. Since then, the house has undergone several upgrades and renovations.

Clan symbolism

Crest badge 
Note: the crest badge is made up of the chief's heraldic crest and motto.

 Chief's motto: Luceo non uro.  (translation from Latin: "I burn but am not consumed", or "I shine, not burn").
 Chief's motto: Luceo non-uro.  (translation from Latin: "I burn but am not consumed", or "I shine, not burn").

Tartan

References 

Scottish clans